Not a Moment Too Soon is the second studio album by American country music singer Tim McGraw. It was released on March 22, 1994. McGraw's breakthrough album, it reached No. 1 on Billboard's Top 200 chart and No. 1 on Billboard Country chart and stayed for 26 consecutive weeks. It was Billboard's best selling album of 1994. For all genres of that year, it was in the top five. The Academy of Country Music named it Album of the Year in 1994.

Five singles were released from this album: in order of release, they were "Indian Outlaw", "Don't Take the Girl", "Down on the Farm", the title track and "Refried Dreams". Respectively, these reached No. 8, No. 1, No. 2, No. 1 and No. 5 on the Billboard Hot Country Songs charts; the first two singles were both Top 20 hits on the Billboard Hot 100 as well.

Track listing

Personnel

Musicians 
 Tim McGraw – lead vocals
 Randy McCormick – piano
 Matt Rollings – piano
 Gary Smith – Hammond organ
 Larry Byrom – acoustic guitar
 Mark Casstevens – acoustic guitar
 Dann Huff – electric guitar
 Brent Rowan – electric guitar
 Sonny Garrish – Dobro, pedal steel guitar
 Mike Brignardello – bass guitar 
 Lonnie Wilson – drums
 Glen Duncan – fiddle
 Stuart Duncan – fiddle
 Curtis Wright – backing vocals
 Curtis Young – backing vocals

Production 
 Byron Gallimore – producer 
 James Stroud – producer 
 Doug Rich – production assistant
 Neuman, Walker & Associates – art direction, design 
 Peter Nash – photography

Technical 
 Julian King – engineer, mix assistant 
 Lynn Peterzell – engineer, mixing, additional engineer 
 Steve Marcantonio – additional engineer 
 Russ Martin – additional engineer 
 Marty Williams – additional engineer 
 Mark Hagen – assistant engineer 
 Ken Hutton – assistant engineer 
 Mark Hurt – assistant engineer 
 Hank Williams – mastering 
 Recorded at Loud Recording, Mesa Recording Studio, Sound Stage Studios and Javelina Recording Studios (Nashville, Tennessee)
 Mixed at Loud Recording
 Mastered at MasterMix (Nashville, Tennessee)

Charts and certifications

Weekly charts

Year-end charts

Decade-end charts

Singles

Certifications

References

External links 
 Not a Moment Too Soon at countrymusic.about.com

1994 albums
Tim McGraw albums
Curb Records albums
Albums produced by Byron Gallimore
Albums produced by James Stroud